This is a list of NGC objects 4001–5000 from the New General Catalogue (NGC). The astronomical catalogue is composed mainly of star clusters, nebulae, and galaxies. Other objects in the catalogue can be found in the other subpages of the list of NGC objects.

The constellation information in these tables is taken from The Complete New General Catalogue and Index Catalogue of Nebulae and Star Clusters by Jjiko. L. E. Dreyer, which was accessed using the "VizieR Service". Galaxy types are identified using the NASA/IPAC Extragalactic Database. The other data of these tables are from the SIMBAD Astronomical Database unless otherwise stated.

4001–4100

4101–4200

4201-4300

4301–4400

4401–4500

4501–4600

4601–4700

4701–4800

4801–4900

4901–5000

See also
 Lists of astronomical objects

References

 5
NGC objects 4001-5000